North Paravur.  formerly known as Paravur or Parur, is a municipality and suburb in Ernakulam district in the Indian state of Kerala. It is a northern suburb of the city of Kochi and is situated around 20 km from the city centre. It is also the first place in India to use electronic voting machine during the by-elections in 1982.

Overview 
The coastal highway NH-66 Panvel-Kanyakumari passes through this historic town. The National Waterway-3 Kollam-Kottapuram passes through the west end of the taluk.

Paravur is believed to be one of the 64 villages created by Parashurama. This town had been an old trading post, a Jewish synagogue and a thriving Jewish community before their conversion to Syrian Christianity in the first century and their resettlement in Israel after its establishment. Cochin Jews lived in the towns of Kochi and North Paravur.

The various denominations of modern Saint Thomas Christians ascribe their unwritten tradition to the end of the 1st century and believe that Thomas landed at Maliankara village in Paravur Taluk in AD 52. In AD 52 Thomas founded the churches popularly known as Ezharappallikal (seven and half churches). Two such churches are at Paravur (Kottakkaavu) and Kodungallur.

History
Paravur derived its name from ancient name Parayur, which literally means the place of Paravar, an ancient tribe. Paravar were the major inhabitants of the coastal areas of Kerala especially near the ancient capital Mohodayapuram of the Chera dynasty. Descriptions about Paravar can be found in Sangha literature.

Paravur was under the administration of the Paravur king. Vypin was also in Parur. The Paravur king joined with Kochi country, but later Parur transferred to the Travancore area (1864) as part of an agreement. The taluk was divided into Paravur and Alangad. Alangad comprised most parts of present-day Aluva taluk. At that period Paravur area included Puthenchira, Mala area of Chalakudy taluk. Muziris was the centre of Indian spice trade for many centuries, and was known to the Yavanas (Greeks) as well as Romans, Jews, Arabs, and Chinese since ancient times. Kochi rose to significance as a trading centre after the port at Muziris was destroyed by massive flooding of the river Periyar in 1341. It was told till that time the Periyar River had a width of Cherai to Munambam. The mud and sand destroyed this natural port and the whole City along with its wealth went below the mud and sand.

Chendamangalam a historical place is also in Paravur. Chendamangalam was the place of Paliath Achans who were the ministers of Kochi kings. Now there is a palace of paliath family in Chendamangalam. Chavara monastery is in Koonammavu. North Paravur municipality is one among the former municipalities in Ernakulam District. Today it is a populated residential town in the Ernakulam district due to its historical importance. Gothuruth, an island in Parur, is the birthplace of the traditional Kerala art form of Chavittunatakam.

North Paravur, formerly known as Parur, was the first constituency to hold elections using Electronic Voting Machine in 1982.

Demographics
As of 2011 Census, Paravur had a population of 31,503 with 15,060 males and 16,443 females. Paravur had an average literacy of 96.75% higher than the state average of 94%: male literacy was 97.8% and female literacy was 95.8%.

Economy
Paravur was once famous in the district for its traditional industries like coir, handlooms and agriculture. Now it is changing to a major residential suburb of Cochin where people looking jobs in city. The Eloor-Edayar industrial belt is in Paravur Taluk.

Geography
Paravur is located at 10.14° N 76.7° E[1]. It has an average elevation of 10 metres (32 feet).
The town is situated at north end of Ernakulam district and bordering with Thrissur district. The towns in Thrissur district like Kodungallore, Mala, Chalakudy and the towns Kalamassery, Aluva, Angamaly, Vypin island are located near to this town. The Paravur Taluk lies in the flat delta region of the Periyar river and cut by several canals, which have resulted in the formation of many islands. The Kodungalloor Kayal (backwaters) and Varappuzha Kayal (backwaters) are in this taluk. The town and neighboring areas were deeply affected by floods in 2018 due to heavy rain.

Landmarks 
 Periyar branch: Paravur river
 Chinese fishing nets in lagoons 
 Pattanam, archeological site & tourism circuit
 Kottayil Kovilakam
 Chendamangalam,  
 Mouth of Chalakudy River
 Varappuzha lagoon and bridge
 North Paravur Town
 Paliyam Palace Museum
 Dakshina Mookambika Temple North Paravur  
 Kottakkavu Mar Thoma Syro-Malabar Pilgrim Church, North Paravur, founded by St. Thomas in AD 52
 St. Thomas Jacobite Syrian Church, North Paravur where the tomb of Mar Gregorios Abdul Jaleel
 Paravur Synagogue is a historical Jewish place of worship

Festivals
Paravur Mookambika Navarathri festival
Kalikulangara valiyavilakku fest
Moothakunam temple fest
Dukrana of St. Thomas the Apostle.
Chakkumarassery Temple Fest
The celebration of Sacred Heart of Jesus, Don Bosco Church North Paravur.
Perumpadanna Holi fest at Perumpadanna KSMS Mahadeva temple.
Mannam Thaypooyam Festival
Peruvaram Temple Fest

Civic administration 

North Paravur is the headquarters of Paravur Taluk and Paravur, Kalamassery State Assembly constituencies. North Paravur and Eloor are Municipalities in Paravur Taluk. The Grama Panchayats in Paravur Taluk are Alengad, Chendamangalam, Chittatukara, Ezhikkara, Kadungalloor, Karumallur, Kottuvally, Kunnukara, Puthanvelikkara, Vadakkekara and Varappuzha. The Block Panchayats are Paravur and Alengad.
Paravur, Kalamassery Assembly constituencies belong to Ernakulam (Lok Sabha constituency) constituency. V.D Satheesan is the M.L.A. of Paravur from 2001. North Paravur is the seat of Ernakulam Additional District court. Other courts are Munsif, Magistrate. There is Sales Tax, Supplies, Sub Treasury offices in Paravur. Paravur civil station is located in Kacheri compound. In India electronic Voting Machines ("EVM")were first used in 1982 in the by-election to North Paravur Assembly Constituency of Kerala for a limited number of polling stations (50 polling stations). Alengad block is situated at Kottapuram.

Police stations in the Taluk area
Paravur Circle: Paravur Station, Varapuzha Stations
Vadakkekara Circle: Vadakkekara Station, Puthenvelikkara Station
Eloor area: Binanipuram Station, Eloor Station
Alengad Station
Fire Service: Paravur Fire Station, FACT Eloor

Transport
KL-42 is the RTO code for Paravur Taluk, Vypin island and North Paravur. Paravur JRTO is situated at Perumpadanna. There is a KSRTC Subdepot, Private Limited Stop bus stand and a private bus stand in the town conducting services to many places in Kerala. There is frequent bus service to Ernakulam, Malabar from here. The nearest railway station is Aluva 16 km away. The Cochin International Airport at Nedumbassery is about 20 km away from the town. There are frequent boat and ferry services on the nearby rivers and lagoons.

Every year boat races are organised in different parts of Paravur and major one is North Paravur water race. Paravur is famous for tug of wars. Volleyball is a popular game in Paravur. There is a municipal stadium in Paravur and FACT ground in Eloor. There are plans to build a swimming pond in the taluk. There is a municipal park in Pullamkulam, near to Peruvaram which is well maintained.

Media in Paravur Taluk
All Major Malayalam newspapers have bureaux in Paravur Taluk. Paravur press club is situated at alinchuvad N.Paravur. Local television stations in Paravur includes Asianet Cable Vision (press club), Paravur Vision Muziris Today (Perumbadana).

Localities in Paravur
These are the localities or wards in Paravur Municipality.
Perumpadanna, Kedamangalam, Nanthiattukunnam, Peruvaram, Vazhikulangara, Kizhakkepram, Vedimara, Pullamkulam, Vaniyakkad, Nandikulangara, Paravoothara, Pallamthuruth, Mattumal, Kurunthotiparamb, Poosaripady, Thoniyakav, Potten street, Mookambi, Municipal, Kacheripady|Court, Chendamangalam Jn, Thekkenaluvazhi, Market, Kannankulangara, Pvt. Busstand

Educational Organizations

Sree Narayana Medical College, Chalaka
SNMIMT Engineering college, Maliankara
SNGIST Professional College, Manjaly
MES College of Engineering and Technology, Kunnukara
Holymatha College of Technology, Manakkapady
SNGIST Arts & Science College, Manakkappady
MES Arts and Science College, Kunnukara
Lakshmi College, Was one of the biggest parallel colleges once.
SNM Training College, Moothakunnam (Aided)
Sree Narayana Higher Secondary School, Pullamkulam, North Paravur
Infant Jesus Public School,Perumbadanna, North Paravur
Adarsha Vidya Bhavan Senior Secondary School, Nanthiyaattkunnam, North Paravur
MES Central School, Kunnukara and Eloor
Government Higher Secondary School (Boys), North Paravur
Government Higher Secondary School (Girls), North Paravur
S.N.V Sanskrit School Nanthiyattukunnam
Hindi Prachara Sabha, Alengad
St. Germains Zion L P School
Sree Narayana Arts and Science coll Kedamangalamalam
 Mar gregorios Abdul jaleel Arts and science college, North paravur

Nearby towns

See also
Paravur Taluk
Ernakulam
Ernakulam District
Kochi
Muziris

References

External links

Ernakulam District website
http://www.mygothuruth.com
 Remaining Date for North Paravur Municipality Election 2020

 
Cities and towns in Ernakulam district
Suburbs of Kochi